Mati Klooren (31 July 1938 – 16 July 2000) was an Estonian actor and theatre director.

Mati Klooren was born in Tallinn. His younger brother was actor Enn Klooren. In 1961, he graduated from the Tallinn State Conservatory's Performing Arts Department. Since 1961, he was an actor at the Estonian Drama Theatre. From 1983 until 1989, he was the head of Estonian Drama Theatre. Besides theatre roles he played also in several films.

Awards
 1969: Meritorious Artist of the Estonian SSR

Filmography

 1976: Aeg elada, aeg armastada
 1989: Äratus 
 1990: See kadunud tee
 1991: Surmatants
 1991: Vana mees tahab koju
 1992: Lammas all paremas nurgas
 1993: Salmonid
 1995: Ma olen väsinud vihkamast

References

1938 births
2000 deaths
Estonian male stage actors
Estonian male film actors
Estonian male television actors
20th-century Estonian male actors
Estonian theatre directors
Estonian Academy of Music and Theatre alumni
Male actors from Tallinn